Digital Economy Partnership Agreement (DEPA) represents a new type of trade agreement to facilitate digital trade and creating a framework for the digital economy, was born out of the common interest of Chile, New Zealand and Singapore.

The agreement was virtually signed on June 12, 2020. South Korea requested to participate on September 13, 2021. China requested to participate on October 31, 2021 and its formal accession process began on August 18, 2022.

References

External links 
 Digital Economy Partnership Agreement (DEPA) Foreign Trade Information System, Organization of American States
 Unpacking the Digital Economy Partnership Agreement(DEPA)
 The Digital Economy Partnership Agreement, a milestone in trade negotiations

Treaties concluded in 2020
Treaties entered into force in 2020
2020 in Singapore
2020 in Chile
2020 in New Zealand
Treaties of Singapore
Treaties of Chile
Treaties of New Zealand
Foreign trade of Singapore
Foreign trade of Chile
Foreign trade of New Zealand